Rashid Abdul Hamid Karami (30 December 1921 – 1 June 1987) was a Lebanese statesman. He is considered one of the most important political figures in Lebanon for more than 30 years, including during much of the Lebanese Civil War (1975–1990), and he served as prime minister eight times, making him the most democratically elected prime minister in history according to the Guinness Book of World Records 2005. He was assassinated in 1987.

Early life and education
Rashid Karami was born in Tripoli, North Lebanon, on 31 December 1920 into one of Lebanon's most prominent Sunni political families. He was the eldest son of Abdul Hamid Karami, an architect of Lebanese independence from France. His father was also the Grand Mufti, or supreme religious judge, of Tripoli, and served as Prime Minister in 1945. Rashid Karami graduated from Cairo University with a law degree in the 1946.

Career
Following his graduation, Karami practiced law in Cairo for three years. On his return to Lebanon, he established a legal practice in Tripoli. He was first elected to the National Assembly in 1951 to fill a vacancy caused by the death of his father. He retained this seat until his death in 1987. One month after being elected he was appointed minister of justice in the government led by Prime Minister Hussein Al Oweini. In 1953, he was also appointed minister of the economy and social affairs in Abdallah El-Yafi's government.

From 1955 to 1987 Karami held office eight times as prime minister, under every President. These terms were from 1955 to 1956, 1958 to 1960, 1961 to 1964, 1965 to 1966, 1966 to 1968, 1969 to 1970, 1975 to 1976, and from 1984 until his death. Karami was thirty-four years old when he first became Prime Minister in 1955. He was the Minister of Finance from 1958 to 1960, 1961 to 1964, 1965 to 1966, 1966 to 1968, 1969 to 1970 and 1975 to 1976. He was the Minister of Defense from 1958 to 1960, 1965, 1975 to 1976. He also served as Minister of Foreign Affairs several times.

He had a stormy relationship with Lebanon's Presidents, who appointed him because of his political connections, despite substantial political differences. He was popularly known as a man for all crises because of a penchant of Lebanon's presidents to turn to him in times of major national strife or political upheaval.

Personality
What made the lawyer from the northern port city of Tripoli so often the man of the hour was a talent for leading the opposition without burning his bridges with the Lebanese president.
Mr. Karami enjoyed political prominence, and an unparalleled popularity. Unlike Nabih Berri of the Shiite Muslims and Walid Jumblat, the Druse leader, he had no militia. While his public statements were often in the florid style common among Arab politicians, he was a skillful practitioner of the intricacies of Lebanese politics. He repeatedly strove to remain as leader of the Government until he decided it was useless to carry on amid the turmoil and violence of Lebanese politics.
While he was fluent in French and had a good command of English, he was always accompanied by an interpreter in interviews with foreign correspondents, because he insisted on speaking Arabic. He was celebrated for being a Statesman with courtly manners, soft-spokenness and taste in clothes. He [...] was often described in the Lebanese press as al effendi - the gentleman.

Policies

Karami was a strong proponent of increasing political power of Lebanon's Muslim community, which in his time increased to outnumber the Christian population for the first time in Lebanese history, causing major ripples in the social fabric of the country. He attempted, without success, to gain greater representation for Muslims in the National Assembly, where they were allocated 45 percent of the seats, a figure that was not adjusted to take account of changing demographics. In 1976, Karami helped broker an agreement to provide for equal parliamentary representation of Christians and Muslims, but this agreement was never implemented. One concession that was made by Christian politicians was to allow legislation signed by the President to be countersigned by the Prime Minister, from 1974 onward, giving the Prime Minister (always a Sunni Muslim) an effective veto.

Karami was a part of the Muslim-Leftist faction in Lebanese politics. During the 1950s, he was a political follower of the Pan-Arabism of Egyptian president Gamal Abdel Nasser. He was first appointed Prime Minister by President Camille Chamoun on 19 September 1955. By the following year, however, he had seriously fallen out with Chamoun over the latter's refusal to sever diplomatic relations with the western powers that had attacked Egypt in the 1956 Suez Crisis of 1956. He again opposed Chamoun in the 1958 Lebanon Crisis, a Nasserist uprising with considerable support in the Muslim community which erupted in May 1958 and attempted to topple the government and join Egypt and Syria in the new United Arab Republic. By September, when Chamoun had quelled the uprising with the aid of United States Marines, Karami formed a government of national unity under the new president, Fuad Chehab.

The Arab–Israeli conflict
Karami served four more times as prime minister throughout the 1960s. During this time, he championed the Palestinian cause, and is believed to have argued for Lebanon to play a more active role against Israel in the Six-Day War of June 1967, a position which was unpopular with many Christians. Increasing clashes between the Lebanese army and the Palestine Liberation Organization forced his resignation in April 1970, but he returned to office in 1975 after an accord had been signed between Lebanon and the PLO. In August that year, however, Suleiman Frangieh, an enemy of Karami, was elected president. Karami resigned and was succeeded by Saeb Salam.

Civil war
The Civil war erupted in Lebanon in April 1975. Multiple factions were involved and the political and military situation was extremely complex, but broadly speaking, the civil war was fought mainly between right-wing, mainly Christian militias (the most prominent of which was the Phalange), and leftist, mainly Muslim militias and their Palestinian allies. Desperate to stabilize the situation, Frangieh dismissed Prime Minister Rashid al-Solh and called on his old adversary Karami to form a government on 1 July. He retreated somewhat from his previous strong support for the Palestinians and supported the Syrian military intervention of June 1976. Despite Karami's political connections and many years of experience, he was unable to end the war, however, and on 8 December 1976 he resigned. Elias Sarkis, who had succeeded Frangieh as president in September 1976, appointed Selim Hoss as the new Prime Minister.

Karami had his militia in Tripoli. He was reconciled to his old enemy, Suleiman Frangieh, in the late 1970s, after Frangieh had fallen out with the Phalangist militia leader, Bachir Gemayel. Together with Frangieh and Walid Jumblatt, Karami founded the National Salvation Front, pro-Syrian coalition of Sunni Muslim, Druze, and some Christians, mainly in the north of Lebanon in July 1983. The National Salvation Front stood in opposition to the presidency of Amine Gemayel and the pact between Lebanon and Israel that was financially supported by the US.

In April 1984, following conferences in Switzerland, Karami became Prime Minister for the eighth time, heading government of national reconciliation. This period saw increasing Syrian influence in the wake of the partial Israeli withdrawal following their invasion of Lebanon in 1982, which Karami had strongly opposed. In 1986 he rejected the National Agreement to Solve the Lebanese Crisis, which had been drafted with minimal Sunni Muslim participation. This opposition created a tense relationship with President Amine Gemayel. Continuing problems led Karami to resign on 4 May 1987, but Gemayel, seeing no viable alternative, refused to accept his resignation.

Personal life
Karami was married to the sister of Anbara Salam and Saeb Salam, who had also been one of the Prime Ministers of Lebanon.

Assassination and burial

On 1 June 1987, Karami was killed after a bomb was placed in his Aérospatiale Puma helicopter en route to Beirut. The bomb weighed about 300 gm. Its remote control trigger had a range of 10 km. It was fixed to the back of his seat and exploded shortly after taking off from an army airfield in the Christian enclave while flying from Tripoli to Beirut. Karami was the only one killed in the blast. Interior Minister Abdullah Rasi and at least three of a dozen other aides and crew members aboard the helicopter were reported wounded. Maronite militia leader Samir Geagea was accused in 1994 for this assassination.

Rashid Karami was buried in a cemetery in the Bab al Raml neighborhood of Tripoli.

The condolences were received in the International fair of Tripoli, a project designed by Oscar Niemeyer.

Perpetrators
Following the assassination, a man claimed responsibility for killing on behalf of the previously unknown Lebanese Secret Army, calling to a Western news agency in Beirut.

In 1999, Samir Geagea and ten other members of the Lebanese Forces were found guilty of the assassination. Soon after Syria's withdrawal from Lebanon in 2005, Samir Geagea and the others were provisionally pardoned and released from jail. However, it has been suggested, by Ashraf Rifi, that a Syrian officer purposely led Karami to the booby-trapped helicopter to assassinate him.

See also
 List of assassinated Lebanese politicians

References

External links

1921 births
1987 deaths
Assassinated heads of government
Assassinated Lebanese politicians
Children of national leaders
Defense ministers of Lebanon
Finance ministers of Lebanon
Government ministers of Lebanon
Lebanese Arab nationalists
Lebanese Sunni Muslims
Members of the Parliament of Lebanon
People murdered in Lebanon
People from Tripoli, Lebanon
Prime Ministers of Lebanon
State leaders killed in aviation accidents or incidents
Lebanese expatriates in Egypt